Aleksandr Krasiy (born 17 March 1990) is a Belarusian professional footballer who plays for Naftan Novopolotsk.

References

External links 
 
 

1990 births
Living people
Belarusian footballers
Association football defenders
FC Polotsk players
FC Vitebsk players
FC Slonim-2017 players
FC Granit Mikashevichi players
FC Naftan Novopolotsk players
Sportspeople from Vitebsk